Hamady Diop (born 2002) is a Senegalese footballer who currently plays for Charlotte FC in Major League Soccer. Diop was the first-overall selection in the 2023 MLS SuperDraft.

Prior to Charlotte FC, Diop played college soccer for three seasons for Clemson University, where he helped the Tigers win the 2021 NCAA Division I men's soccer championship game. Diop played club soccer for Montverde Academy and for SIMA Águilas.

Career

Youth and college 
Diop played youth soccer for Montverde Academy and its affiliated soccer club, SIMA Águilas. 

Ahead of the 2020 NCAA Division I men's soccer season, Diop signed a National Letter of Intent to play college soccer with Clemson University. There, he was a three-year starter. He finished his college career with 42 appearances, 40 of which were starts, and scored seven goals and provided three assists.

While at Clemson, Diop was named to the All-ACC Second-Team, the ACC All-Freshman Team, and the TopDrawer Soccer Top 100 Freshman for the 2020 season.

Professional 
Ahead of the 2023 MLS SuperDraft, Diop signed a Generation adidas contract with Major League Soccer. On December 21, 2022, he was drafted first-overall by Charlotte FC. Diop became the second Clemson player to be drafted first overall, and the second in three years alongside Robbie Robinson, who was drafted first overall in the 2020 MLS SuperDraft. Diop also became the fourth ever African player to be selected first overall and the first Senegalese player to be drafted first overall.

References

External links
Clemson Tigers profile

2002 births
Living people
Association football defenders
Senegalese footballers
Expatriate soccer players in the United States
Senegalese expatriate sportspeople in the United States
Charlotte FC draft picks
Charlotte FC players
Major League Soccer first-overall draft picks
Major League Soccer players
Clemson Tigers men's soccer players
Soccer players from Florida
Footballers from Dakar